Crimebusters + Crossed Wires: Stories from This American Life is a compilation album featuring radio broadcasts from This American  Life. The two-disc set contains contributions by Ira Glass, David Sedaris, and Sarah Vowell.

Track listing
Squirrel Cop
Loser
Flight vs. Invisibility
Watching the Detective
The Greatest Phone Message of All Time
Jesus Shaves
Say It to Me in Guy Language
When the Wall Came Tumbling Down
Everyone Speaks Elton John
Music Lessons

See also
This American Life: Hand It Over -- Stories from Our First Year on the Air
Lies, Sissies, and Fiascoes: The Best of This American Life
Stories of Hope and Fear

External links
This American Life on-line store

This American Life albums
2003 compilation albums
Shout! Factory compilation albums